Brooke Bloom  is an American actress. She is best known for her starring role as Ronah in the drama film She's Lost Control (2014).

Career
Her first on-screen appearance was a role as Grunge Girl in the episode "Team Play" of CBS's medical drama television series Chicago Hope. In 1999, she appeared in several guest starring television roles, including Buffy the Vampire Slayer, ER, Felicity, Popular and Wasteland. She portrayed Teenage Usher in the romantic comedy film Forever Lulu (2000). She has also appeared in films All the Boys Love Mandy Lane (2006), Over Her Dead Body (2008), He's Just Not That Into You (2009), Gabi on the Roof in July (2010) and Ceremony (2010). She portrayed Ronah in the dark drama film She's Lost Control (2014), written and directed by Anja Marquardt. Bloom won "Best Actress" award at the 2014 Thessaloniki International Film Festival for her performance in the film. Marc Adams of Screen International said that there's "much to admire in Marquardt’s control and precision as well as a well sustained lead performance by lead actress Brooke Bloom (...) Brooke Bloom is impressive..."

She portrayed Cynthia Wells in 16 episodes of the police procedural drama television series CSI: Miami. She also had roles in television series Jack & Bobby, Everwood, JAG, In Justice, Good Wife, In Plain Sight, Law & Order, Carpoolers, Person of Interest and The New Normal. In 2017, she played Rebecca Rogers in the Netflix series Gypsy.

In 2015, Bloom won an Obie Award presented by the American Theatre Wing for her performance in the Off-Broadway play You Got Older written by Clare Barron.

Filmography

References

External links
 

Living people
American film actresses
American television actresses
American stage actresses
20th-century American actresses
21st-century American actresses
Date of birth missing (living people)
Year of birth missing (living people)
Place of birth missing (living people)